Marchand is an unincorporated community in Indiana County, Pennsylvania, United States. Marchand had a post office until it closed on April 23, 2005; it still has its own ZIP code, 15758.

References

Unincorporated communities in Indiana County, Pennsylvania
Unincorporated communities in Pennsylvania